Patientia (minor planet designation: 451 Patientia) is approximately the 15th-largest asteroid in the asteroid belt with a diameter of 225 km. It was discovered by French astronomer Auguste Charlois on 4 December 1899, and assigned a provisional designation 1899 EY.

It regularly reaches 11th magnitude in brightness, as on 11 January 2013, and 12 December 2017, when in favorable oppositions will be at magnitudes 10.7 and 10.4 respectively, very bright for a later-discovered minor planet.

Multiple photometric studies of this asteroid were performed between 1969 and 2003. The combined data gave an irregular light curve with a synodic period of 9.730 ± 0.004 hours and a brightness variation of 0.05–0.10 in magnitude.

References

External links
 
 

Background asteroids
Patientia
Patientia
CU-type asteroids (Tholen)
18991204